The 1999 NBL season was the 18th season of the National Basketball League. The 1999 season saw just nine teams compete, with Hawke's Bay joining the second-tiered Conference Basketball League (CBL) and Northland ceasing operations after four dismal seasons in the NBL. Auckland won the championship in 1999 to claim their sixth league title.

Final standings

Season awards
 NZ Most Valuable Player: Pero Cameron (Auckland)
 Most Outstanding Guard: Terrence Lewis (Wellington)
 Most Outstanding NZ Guard: Kirk Penney (North Harbour)
 Most Outstanding Forward: Chris Ensminger (North Harbour)
 Most Outstanding NZ Forward/Centre: Pero Cameron (Auckland)
 Scoring Champion: Terrence Lewis (Wellington)
 Rebounding Champion: Chris Ensminger (North Harbour)
 Assist Champion: Willie Burton (Palmerston North)
 Rookie of the Year: Tony Rampton (Taranaki)
 Coach of the Year: Tab Baldwin (Auckland)
 All-Star Five:
 G: Terrence Lewis (Wellington)
 G: Phill Jones (Otago)
 F: Scott Benson (Auckland)
 F: Pero Cameron (Auckland)
 C: Chris Ensminger (North Harbour)

References

External links
1999 NBL news
1999 NBL season stats
1999 New Zealand Basketball Challenge
Auckland Wins Pre-Season Tournament

National Basketball League (New Zealand) seasons
1999 in New Zealand basketball